Adam Michel (27 May 1936 – 8 January 1990) was a Polish footballer. He played in three matches for the Poland national football team from 1959 to 1960.

References

External links
 

1936 births
1990 deaths
Polish footballers
Poland international footballers
Place of birth missing
Association footballers not categorized by position